Tinkerbelle (sometimes referred to as Tinkerbelle the dog) is a canine model and internet celebrity. She was listed as one of the Most Entrepreneurial Dogs in America by Entrepreneur and is considered a social media influencer with more than 400,000 followers on Instagram.

Tinkerbelle was rescued from a shelter by Sam Carrell in 2012. Carrell was at the shelter visiting a friend, but was told Tinkerbelle would not socialize, eat, or come to anyone. Carrell adopted her and took her everywhere she went in order to socialize her, eventually meeting an agent while on a walk in New York City.

Tinkerbelle debuted as a dog model in a Ralph Lauren collection. She has since modeled for brands that include American Eagle, Burt's Bees, and Converse. Additional appearances include playing Chowsie, Rose's dog, in a production of Gypsy, and in promos for the movie A Dog's Purpose. She is also a regular at New York Fashion Week. She and her owner Sam Curell have appeared with many other celebrities such as Latto, Camila Cabello, 5 Seconds of Summer, Ryan Seacrest, and many more. In addition, her social media accounts include all of her luxurious travels across the United States. She has continued to increase her following by appearing at red carpet events such as Wango Tango, and being seen on talk shows like Access Daily. 

She is now commonly seen with her co-dog Belle in many films, tv shows, print, and runway.  

She was named after Tinker Bell, the fairy character from Peter Pan.

See also
 Boo
 Manny the Frenchie
 Tuna
 List of individual dogs

References

External links
 Official website
Tinkerbelle on Instagram
 
 Tinkerbelle on Twitter
 Tinkerbelle on TikTok

Animals on the Internet
Female mammals
Individual dogs
Social media influencers